Marcos Valdés Bojalil is a Mexican television actor and singer in Mexico. He is best known for his starring role in the series Ladrón de corazones.

He is the son of Manuel Valdés and half-brother of Cristian Castro.

Movies
Dr. Abel in The Triumph of Living By Glat Entertainment (2019)
Philoctetes in Hercules By Disney (1997)
Baloo in Jungle Book 2 By Disney (2003)
Crazy Joe in Shark Tale By DreamWorks (2004)

See also
Valdés family

References

External links
 

Year of birth missing (living people)
Living people
20th-century Mexican male actors
Mexican male television actors
Mexican male singers
Mexican people of Spanish descent
Mexican people of Italian descent
21st-century Mexican male actors